The 1965 Ohio Bobcats football team was an American football team that represented Ohio University in the Mid-American Conference (MAC) during the 1965 NCAA University Division football season. In their eighth season under head coach Bill Hess, the Bobcats compiled a 0–10 record (0–6 against MAC opponents), finished in seventh place in the MAC, and were outscored by all opponents by a combined total of 210 to 77.  They played their home games in Peden Stadium in Athens, Ohio.

The team's statistical leaders included Sam Bogan with 308 rushing yards, Sam Fornsaglio with 305 passing yards, and Glenn Hill with 201 receiving yards.

Schedule

References

Ohio
Ohio Bobcats football seasons
College football winless seasons
Ohio Bobcats football